Nan B. Frank was a social worker and women's suffrage leader.

Early life
Nan Bamburgh was born on May 2, 1886, in Princeton, Illinois. She was the daughter of Joseph J. and Regina Bamburgh.

Career
Nan B. Frank was a volunteering social worker.

Frank was very active in California League of Women Voters and served on several important committees.

Frank was the president of the San Francisco Center of California League of Women Voters. When women obtained the right to vote in California in 1911, they started the San Francisco Center; in 1920, the center became part of the League of Women Voters.

Frank was a member of: Women's City Club and Temple Emanu-El Sisterhood.

Personal life
Nan B. Frank moved to California at the beginning of the 20th century and lived at 139 Fourteenth Ave., San Francisco, California.

Nan Bamburgh married Ludwig Frank. Their children were: James E, Richard L., Emily Ann.

She died on April 24, 1980, in San Mateo, California.

References

1886 births
1980 deaths
American suffragists
20th-century American politicians
Progressive Era in the United States
20th-century American women politicians
People from Princeton, Illinois
Members of the League of Women Voters